Jia Kui may refer to:

 Jia Kui (scholar) (賈逵), courtesy name Jingbo (景伯), Eastern Han Dynasty scholar and astronomer, see Yin Mo
 Jia Kui (general) (賈逵), courtesy name Liangdao (梁道), official of the late Eastern Han Dynasty and early Three Kingdoms period